Zheng Lücheng (27 August 1914 – 7 December 1976) was a Korea-born Chinese composer of Korean ethnicity. He is most notable for having composed the music to the Military Anthem of the People's Liberation Army, to words by Gong Mu (公木; real name: Zhang Yongnian).

Early life
Zheng was born Cheong Bu-eun (정부은, 鄭富恩) in the South Jeolla Province of what is now South Korea in either 1914 or 1918. Official records show his year of birth at 1918, but it is believed he may have concealed his age to maintain cover as an agent in Nanjing.

In 1933, Zheng moved to Nanjing, China, where he became associated with the Korean-Chinese anti-Japanese invasion movement and then with the communists.

Career

In 1937, in Yan'an, Zheng composed the song which was to become the military anthem of the People's Liberation Army.

In 1945, Zheng returned to Korea or, precisely, North Korea, where he worked as chief of the North Korean army's band and taught music at Pyongyang University. Zheng wrote the anthem of the Korean People's Army, Tumen River, East Sea Fisherman and other songs. After the outbreak of Korean War, Zheng returned to China, where he composed many works including a Chinese-language Western-style opera, Cloud Gazing based on a story of the Bai people.

Personal life
Zheng's wife was China's first female ambassador, Ding Xuesong.

In 1950, when the Korean War broke out, Zhou Enlai — having been petitioned by Zheng's Chinese wife, Ding Xuesong — personally wrote to Kim Il Sung requesting that Zheng returns to China for work. Kim agreed; and, in 1950, Zheng obtained Chinese nationality.

References

People's Republic of China composers
Chinese male classical composers
Chinese classical composers
Chinese opera composers
Chinese people of Korean descent
Male opera composers
1914 births
1976 deaths
Republic of China musicians
Korean emigrants to China
Naturalized citizens of the People's Republic of China
People from South Jeolla Province
20th-century composers
20th-century Chinese musicians
20th-century male musicians
Burials at Babaoshan Revolutionary Cemetery